Act of Piracy is a 1988 American/South African thriller film directed by John Cardos and starring Gary Busey, Belinda Bauer and Ray Sharkey. While enjoying an exotic cruise to Australia, a family yacht is taken over by terrorists. It is also known as Barracuda.

Plot

Ted Andrews (Gary Busey) persuades his ex-wife Sandy (Belinda Bauer) to let their kids Mark (Mathew Stewardson) and Tracey (Candicé Hillebrand) accompany him and his girlfriend Laura Warner (Nancy Mulford) on a journey on his multimillion-dollar yacht to Australia, where he plans to sell the yacht.

However, after a few days, it turns out that Laura is member of a terrorist organization led by Jack Wilcox (Ray Sharkey), who wants the boat as a base for his operations. Jack takes over the yacht and only Ted can escape, and as a result, Mark and Tracey are kept as hostages.

Together with Sandy, Ted starts an international search to find Wilcox, and rescue Mark and Tracey.

Cast
 Gary Busey - Ted Andrews 
 Belinda Bauer - Sandy Andrews 
 Ray Sharkey - Jack Wilcox 
 Nancy Mulford - Laura Warner 
 Dennis Casey Park - Dennis 
 Arnold Vosloo - Sean Stevens 
 Ken Gampu - Herb Bunting 
 Anthony Fridjohn - Philip O'Connor 
 Mathew Stewardson - Mark Andrews 
 Candice Hillebrand - Tracey Andrews 
 Nadia Bilchik - Maria
 Roly Jansen - Carlos Ortiz 
 Gordon Mulholland - Captain Jenkins 
 Thoko Ntshinga - Cynthia 
 Melody O'Brian - Nadine Andrews 
 Brian O'Shaughnessy - Skipper 
 Eckard Rabe - Agent Harris 
 Joe Stewardson - Agent Johnson 
 Bruce Wentzel - Mate
 Christobel D'Orthez - Karen Daly 
 Thys Du Plooy - Ahmed 
 Trevor Fish - Cameraman 
 Mark Gilbert - Crew Man
 Scott J. Ateah - Cook 
 Allen Booi - George Chibanda 
 Douglas Bristow - C.W. Andrews 
 John Cardos - Steward

References

External links
 
 
 

1988 films
1980s action thriller films
American action thriller films
American crime thriller films
American independent films
1980s English-language films
English-language South African films
South African action thriller films
South African crime thriller films
Films about ship hijackings
1980s crime thriller films
Seafaring films
Films directed by John Cardos
Pirate films
1980s American films